Ağcayazı is a Turkic word that may refer to several places:

Azerbaijan
 Ağcayazı, Lachin, a village in Lachin Rayon
 Yuxarı Ağcayazı (Upper Ağcayazı), a village and municipality in Agdash Rayon
 Aşağı Ağcayazı (Lower Ağcayazı), a village in the municipality

Turkey
 Ağcayazı, Vezirköprü, a village in the Vezirköprü district of Samsun Province, Turkey